Kim Madsen (born 13 February 1978) is a Danish former professional footballer who played as a defender. He played nine games for various Danish youth national team selections.

After his career as a player, he shortly managed Karlslunde IF alongside David Rasmussen and Poul Hübertz in 2014.

Honours
FC Copenhagen
 Danish Superliga: 2000–01

References

External links
 Danish national team profile 
 F.C. Copenhagen stats 
 Career stats at Danmarks Radio 

1978 births
Living people
People from Roskilde
Association football central defenders
Association football defenders
Danish men's footballers
Denmark under-21 international footballers
F.C. Copenhagen players
Køge Boldklub players
VfL Wolfsburg players
FC Hansa Rostock players
Aarhus Gymnastikforening players
Danish Superliga players
Danish expatriate men's footballers
Bundesliga players
2. Bundesliga players
Expatriate footballers in Germany
Danish football managers
Karlslunde IF managers
Sportspeople from Region Zealand